Agder Energi is a Norwegian energy group involved in hydroelectric power generation, electricity distribution, electricity trading and services for customers in the business and consumer markets. The Group operates in Norway, Scandinavia and the rest of Europe, and focuses on developing hydroelectric power in Norway and investing in new trading solutions for the decentralised European energy market.

The majority shareholders are the thirty municipalities in the counties of Vest Agder and Aust Agder, who have a combined ownership interest of 54.475 percent. Statkraft Holding AS owns the remaining 45.525 percent of the shares.

Subsidiaries 
Entelios
LOS
Agder Energi Nett
Agder Energi Vannkraft

See also

 Scotland-Norway interconnector

References

Electric power companies of Norway
Companies based in Kristiansand
Statkraft
Energy companies established in 2000
Companies formerly owned by municipalities of Norway
Norwegian companies established in 2000